Mount Ferrara is a mountain in Antarctica,  high, standing  northeast of Vaca Nunatak in the Panzarini Hills portion of the Argentina Range, in the Pensacola Mountains of Antarctica. It was discovered and photographed during a U.S. Navy transcontinental nonstop plane flight of January 13, 1956 from McMurdo Sound to the Weddell Sea and return. It was named by the Advisory Committee on Antarctic Names for Chief Aviation Machinists Mate Frederick J. Ferrara, U.S. Navy, crew chief of the P2V-2N Neptune aircraft making the flight.

References 

Mountains of Queen Elizabeth Land
Pensacola Mountains